Rufus Hildreth Thayer (1850–1917) was, between 1909 and 1913, the judge of the United States Court for China based in Shanghai.

Early life

Thayer was born in Plymouth, Michigan, on June 19, 1850. He graduated from the University of Michigan in 1871.

Career

Thayer joined the Library of Congress as an assistant librarian. At the same time he studied law and graduated in 1874. He was appointed law clerk in the Treasury Department where he remained for ten years before leaving to form the law firm, Thayer & Rankin. He also served as a Judge Advocate General of the National Guard in Washington DC.

In 1909, he was appointed judge of the United States Court for China replacing Lebbeus R. Wilfley.  He served until 1913, when he resigned when investigations were begun into some of the expenses he had claimed.  Rather than face an investigation, Thayer resigned with effect from December 31, 1913.  He was succeeded by Charles S. Lobingier

Death

Thayer died on 12 July 1917 of apoplexy in Kingston, New York.  He was buried at Albany Rural Cemetery, Menands, New York.

Further reading
 , Vol. 1: ; Vol. 2: ; Vol. 3:

References

1850 births
1917 deaths
Judges of the United States Court for China
University of Michigan alumni
20th-century American judges
People from Plymouth, Michigan
Burials at Albany Rural Cemetery
United States district court judges appointed by Theodore Roosevelt